Lachesilla pacifica is a species of Psocoptera from the Lachesillidae family that can be found in France and Switzerland.

References

Lachesillidae
Insects described in 1930
Psocoptera of Europe